Penicillium formosanum is a species of the genus of Penicillium which produces patulin and asteltoxin.

See also
 List of Penicillium species

References

formosanum
Fungi described in 1987